Ravishing Grimness is the seventh studio album by Norwegian black metal band Darkthrone. It was released 29 September 1999 by Moonfog Productions.

Nocturno Culto wrote the music for all the songs except "The Beast", which was the sole musical contribution by Fenriz, who contributed lyrics instead.

In the album's booklet, Nocturno Culto was credited as "Nocturnal Cult". Also, all the Ts in the liner notes and lyrics were replaced with inverted crosses.

Ravishing Grimness was re-released with new artwork in 2011 by Peaceville Records.

Track listing

Personnel
Darkthrone
Nocturno Culto – electric guitar, bass guitar, vocals
Fenriz – drums

Production
Nocturno Culto – cover design
Bernt B. Ottem – cover design

References 

Darkthrone albums
1999 albums